Gao–Guenie is a H5 ordinary chondrite meteorite that fell on Burkina Faso, West Africa, on March 5, 1960. The fall was composed of many fragments and it is one of the largest observed meteorite showers in Africa to date.

Name
The meteorites formerly known as Gao and Guenie in 1999 were officially paired and they name fused into the collective name Gao–Guenie.

History

Gao–Guenie meteorites fell in Burkina Faso on March 5, 1960 at 17:00 (local time). Eyewitnesses said that some trees were broken and henhouses destroyed.

Composition and classification
Gao–Guenie is classified as H5 ordinary chondrite.

See also
 Glossary of meteoritics

References

External links 

Meteorites found in Burkina Faso
Environment of Burkina Faso
1960 in Upper Volta
1960 in Africa
1960 in science